The 1968 Brisbane Rugby League season was the 60th season of the Brisbane Rugby League premiership. Eight teams from across Brisbane competed for the premiership, which culminated in Past Brothers defeating Eastern Suburbs 21–4 in the grand final, winning their second consecutive premiership.

Ladder

Finals

Grand Final 
Past Brothers 21 (Tries: Wayne Abdy 2, John Smith, Eric Gelling, Pat Maguire Goals: Nev Harman 3)

Eastern Suburbs 4 (Goals: Peter Lobegeiger 2)

References 

1968 in rugby league
1968 in Australian rugby league
Rugby league in Brisbane